Alfons Francis Grabowski (September 4, 1901 – October 29, 1966) was a pitcher in Major League Baseball. He played for the St. Louis Cardinals.

He was an exceptional hitting pitcher in his brief stint in the majors, posting a .327 batting average (16-for-49) with 10 runs, 4 doubles, 1 triple and 6 RBI in 39 games pitched.

References

External links

1901 births
1966 deaths
Major League Baseball pitchers
St. Louis Cardinals players
Hanover Raiders players
Baseball players from Syracuse, New York
Montpelier Goldfish players